Adrian Frank Gordon Griffith (born 19 November 1971) is a former West Indies cricketer who played in 14 Test matches from 1996–97 to 2000.

A tall left-handed batsman, Griffith made his first and only Test hundred, against New Zealand at Hamilton in 1999–2000. His innings of 114 was made in a 276 run opening stand with Sherwin Campbell. He batted on each day of the Test, and in the process became only the sixth batsman in the history of Test cricket to do so.

References

1971 births
Living people
Barbados cricketers
West Indies One Day International cricketers
West Indies Test cricketers
Barbadian cricketers
Cricketers at the 1998 Commonwealth Games
Commonwealth Games competitors for Barbados